Stacked Sandwich Shop was a sandwich shop in Portland, Oregon's Hosford-Abernethy neighborhood, in the United States. The restaurant was opened in 2017 by Gabriel Pascuzzi, who later announced his plans to close the restaurant in 2021.

In 2023, Pascuzzi confirmed plans to reopen the business in a space previously occupied by Sunshine Noodles.

Description
Sandwiches include an oxtail French dip and a turkey Reuben with purple sauerkraut, as well as roast beef, a turkey club, and grilled cheese.

History
Gabriel Pascuzzi opened the restaurant on February 17, 2017. Stacked began serving brunch in October 2017, and also offered special holiday meals.

Stacked closed temporarily during the COVID-19 pandemic. In December 2021, Pascuzzi announced plans to close permanently on December 19, citing supply chain issues and high meat costs as reasons.

In February 2023, Pascuzzi confirmed plans to reopen Stacked in a shared space with a second location of his restaurant Feel Good. The businesses will operate in the space previously occupied by Sunshine Noodles.

Reception
In 2017, Eater Portland nominated Stacked as one of "Portland's Game-Changing Restaurant of the Year". Additionally, Pascuzzi was nominated for Chef of the Year for his work at Stacked. Michael Russell of The Oregonian named Stacked one of "Portland's new sandwich All Stars of 2017". In 2020, Alex Frane included Stacked in Eater Portland list of "14 Excellent Sandwich Shops to Try in Portland".

See also

 COVID-19 pandemic in Portland, Oregon
 Impact of the COVID-19 pandemic on the meat industry in the United States
 Impact of the COVID-19 pandemic on the restaurant industry in the United States
 List of defunct restaurants of the United States

References

External links

 

2017 establishments in Oregon
2021 disestablishments in Oregon
Defunct restaurants in Portland, Oregon
Hosford-Abernethy, Portland, Oregon
Restaurants disestablished in 2021
Restaurants disestablished during the COVID-19 pandemic
Restaurants established in 2017
Sandwich restaurants